Grant Evans (born 3 January 1990) is a Scottish professional footballer, who plays for Albion Rovers, on loan from Pollok. He has previously played in the Scottish Premier League for Hamilton Academical.

Career
He made his début for Hamilton Academical in August 2007 against Ayr United in the Scottish League Challenge Cup.

He went on loan to Scottish Third Division side Dumbarton, in January 2008, until the end of the season. He made his debut for Dumbarton against St Mirren in the Scottish Cup that same month.

In July 2010, Evans was loaned to Greenock Morton until January 2011.

After his loan expired in May 2010, the move was made permanent. He was released from the club in May 2012, signing for Airdrie United the following month.

Evans left Airdrieonians in May 2014, and signed for Junior side Irvine Meadow the following month. After two seasons at Meadow Park, Evans joined Pollok in August 2016.

In January 2021, Evans returned to the SPFL coming in on loan for Scottish League Two side Albion Rovers alongside fellow Pollok player Mark Sideserf.

References

External links

See also
Greenock Morton F.C. season 2010–11 | 2011–12

Dumbarton F.C. players
Hamilton Academical F.C. players
Living people
Greenock Morton F.C. players
Scottish Football League players
1990 births
Scottish Premier League players
Scottish footballers
Association football defenders
Footballers from Glasgow
Airdrieonians F.C. players
Irvine Meadow XI F.C. players
Pollok F.C. players
Scottish Professional Football League players
Scottish Junior Football Association players
Albion Rovers F.C. players

West of Scotland Football League players